Native Bay is a waterway in Kivalliq Region, Nunavut, Canada. It is located in Hudson Bay off western Southampton Island. The Bell Peninsula lies to the southeast. Native Point is located at the bay's southern tip.

Geography
The habitat is characterized by barrens, coastal marine features, grassy meadows, inlets, rocky flats, sedge, and tundra.

Fauna
East Bay/Native Bay is a Canadian Important Bird Area (#NU023). Notable bird species include Atlantic brant, colonial waterbirds, seabirds, common eider, and lesser snow goose.

Caribou frequent the area.

History
An archeological site exists on the west side of Native Point, the largest Sallirmiut site on the island.

References

Bays of Kivalliq Region
Important Bird Areas of Kivalliq Region